Oskar Aleksandrovich Kuchera (born Bogolyubov; 11 August 1974) is a Russian actor, TV presenter and radio host. He was born in Moscow. He has made appearances in movies such as Unreal Love and Soldiers and is a presenter on Top Gear Russia.

Early life 
He was born to Tatyana Kuchera, an editor-in-chief at the Bureau of Propaganda of Motion Pictures, and Alexander Bogolubov, a director of war movies and animated films.

Selected filmography 
 2004: Улицы разбитых фонарей / Streets of Broken Lights (TV Series, 13 Season)
 2005: Мужской сезон: Бархатная революция / Male Season: Velvet Revolution as Barman
 2006–2010: Солдаты / Soldiers (TV Series, 9-16 parts) as Captain Aleksandr Kurenkov
 2006: Русские деньги / Russian money as Apollon Murzavetskiy
 2007: Код Апокалипсиса / The Apocalypse Code as Anton
 2007: Руд и Сэм / Rude and Sam as Taksist
 2008: Всё могут короли / Kings Can Do Everything as Photographer Garik
 2011: Новые приключения Аладдина / New Adventures of Aladdin as Aladdin
 2012: Мужской сезон 2: Время гнева / Male Season 2: Time of Wrath
 2013: Возвращение Буратино / The Return of Buratino (Cartoon) as Buratino (voice)
2014: Нереальная любовь / Unreal Love as Oligarch Yuri Sokolov
2014: Полный вперед / Full speed ahead as Petruhin, Fedor's father
2017: Команда Б / Team B (TV Series, 1 season) as Gennadiy, space tourist

References

External links 

 
Oskar Kuchera on Kinopoisk

1974 births
Living people
Male actors from Moscow
Russian television presenters
Russian male film actors
Russian male television actors
Russian male voice actors
20th-century Russian male actors
21st-century Russian male actors
Russian radio personalities
Russian Academy of Theatre Arts alumni
Anti-Ukrainian sentiment in Russia
21st-century Russian singers
21st-century Russian male singers
Mass media people from Moscow